Ali Haji (born 30 October 1999) is an Indian actor and director who appears in Bollywood films. Before his breakthrough, he had smaller roles in Fanaa portraying Rehan Qadri Jr. as Aamir Khan and Kajol's son., Ranveer Singh "Champ" in the 2007 film Ta Ra Rum Pum as Saif Ali Khan and Rani Mukerji's son, and Suraj Sinha in Line of Descent alongside Brendan Fraser. He also starred in Super 30 (2019) directed by Vikas Bahl as a supporting role.  Haji made his main film debut in Yoodlee films's Noblemen (2018) directed by Vandana Kataria as Shay. He won Best Child Actor at the New York Indian Film Festival for Noblemen for his starring role. Ali Haji, currently, has written and directed his first feature film called #JusticeForGoodContent. The film is currently in post-production.

Career
Ali has been a part of over 100 TV commercials and his first film was Family as Amitabh Bachchan's grandson but was uncredited. He has also been a crucial part of the Bollywood feature titled Line of Descent previously known as The Field with Brendan Fraser, Ronit Roy, Neeraj Kabi, and Ali Haji as brothers trying to take over their father's, Prem Chopra business with Haji playing Suraj Sinha, the youngest of the brothers.

Ali starred in his first main role in the film Noblemen for which he won ‘Best Child Actor’ award at the New York Indian Film Festival. The film, also featuring Kunal Kapoor was directed by Vandana Kataria and produced by Saregama and Yoodlee Films, in which the film deals with boarding school and bullying issues. In 2019, he had a supporting role in the film, Super 30 starring Hrithik Roshan. Finally, in 2020, amidst the pandemic, Ali Haji rose like a true underdog as he wrote and filmed his first feature film titled #JusticeforGoodContent. It is currently in post-production. The story is a satire on the Indian film industry's long standing insider-outsider debate with the protagonist named Good Content. It maps the journey of a young filmmaker through the rigamarole of various processes, like producers, casting directors and talent agents to mount a film. The film, by design, has an ensemble cast filled with stellar names from the supporting actor prototype such as Suresh Menon, Anu Menon, Vijay Patkar, Rajkumar Kanojia, Max Fernandes, Jaimini Pathak, Delnaaz Irani, Raj Zutshi, Pradeep Kabra, Kritika Avasthi, Dilnaz Irani, Krishna Bisht, Rati Shankar Tripathi, Rajendra Chawla, Prabhjyot Singh, Vanita Kharat and many many more. The film is slated for a digital release in 2022 later this year.

Ali additionally owns a theatre production studio known as Clean Slate Studios, under which he has written and directed two plays, Kaaya and in July 2016, a satire on the Indian parenting system, The Mad World of Rustom Irani.

Filmography

Films

Director

References

External links
 

Indian male child actors
1999 births
Living people